The Garfield water wheel, sometimes referred to as the Forrest Creek Mine water wheel, was a large water wheel used to power a stamper battery at a gold mine near Chewton, Victoria, Australia. Constructed in 1887, the water wheel was used until 1903 and then was dismantled in 1904. There are some remnants at its location.

History 
There was insufficient water in local streams to power a water wheel. The Garfield mine and others in the area originally relied upon steam engines to power their stamper mills. It was not until the construction of the Coliban System of Waterworks (now Coliban Water) that the gold mining areas had a reliable source of water, diverted from the Coliban River, for  both domestic and mining purposes. Eventually, at least seven water wheels were built and operated in the Castlemain-Chewton area.

Constructed in 1887, the Garfield water wheel was used until 1903 then was dismantled in 1904.

Technology 
Water flow to the Garfield wheel was via a 786 foot (258 m) long elevated flume—15 inches wide by 10 inches deep (0.375 x 0.25 m) and mounted on a timber trestle structure—which connected to a branch race of the water supply near the top of an adjacent hill. The flow to the wheel itself was controlled by an arrangement of levers. The tail water from the Garfield wheel powered another water wheel (40 foot / 12.2 m diameter) belonging to the Manchester mine, about 400m away.

The wheel was stopped, when required, by diverting the water, from the overhead flume directly to the tail race, via a vertical bypass chute that allowed the downstream water wheel to continue working. The wheel was started, by feeding water so as to fill buckets part way up the wheel; once motion was achieved, the water flow was applied to the upper buckets and the wheel could then be run at up to its full power.

The spokes of the wheel were made of wood, and its structure was strengthened by circular iron bands. It carried 220 galvanised iron buckets of five imperial gallons (22.7 litres) capacity each. The wheel rotated once every 45 to 55 seconds, corresponding to 1.33 to 1.09 rpm. Power was transferred via an iron gear wheel, mounted on the wheel at about two-thirds of the distance between its centre and rim. That arrangement reduced the torque applied to the axle of the water wheel, allowing the wheel to be of lighter construction than if power was transferred via its axle. Cogs on the gear wheel engaged with a pinion, which in turn drove a power transfer shaft, at a far higher rotational speed than that of the water wheel. The transfer shaft powered a 15-head stamper battery—probably later extended to 25-heads—via an arrangement of pulleys and flat belts. The battery ran at 78-86 falls per minute; there being typically two cam arms per stamper head, the shaft of the battery probably ran at 39 to 43 rpm.

Remnants 
The stonework supports of the water wheel and the water races remain at the site, which is now part of the Castlemaine Diggings National Heritage Park. The Garfield ruins are the best preserved of at least seven water wheels that once operated in the Castlemaine-Chewton area and powered stamper batteries.

References

External links
 Friends of Mount Alexander Diggings - Garfield Water Wheel

1887 establishments in Australia
North Central Victoria
Water wheels in Australia